Barsine lucibilis is a moth of the family Erebidae, subfamily Arctiinae. The species was first described by Charles Swinhoe in 1892. It is endemic to Borneo. It is found in lowland forests and also occurs in disturbed habitats. It is found at elevations up to 1,000 meters.

External links

Nudariina
Moths of Borneo
Moths described in 1892